Horse chestnut may refer to:
Horse-chestnut tree or Aesculus hippocastanum, a species of large deciduous tree
Horse chestnuts, Eurasian species of the genus Aesculus
Horse Chestnut (horse), a South African Thoroughbred racehorse
Chestnut (coat), a common coat color in horses
Chestnut (horse anatomy), the callous on the leg of a horse

See also
Horse-chestnut leaf miner, a moth of the lepidopteran family Gracillariidae
Chestnut (disambiguation)